Colin George Prophett (born 8 March 1947 in Crewe) is a former professional footballer. He was a defender who played for Sheffield Wednesday, Norwich City, Swindon Town, Chesterfield and Crewe Alexandra.

Prophett made his league debut on 6 September 1969 for Sheffield Wednesday in an away match at Arsenal.

References
Canary Citizens by Mark Davage, John Eastwood, Kevin Platt, published by Jarrold Publishing, (2001),

External links
Colin Prophett at Swindon-Town-FC.co.uk

1947 births
Crewe Alexandra F.C. players
Sheffield Wednesday F.C. players
Norwich City F.C. players
Swindon Town F.C. players
Chesterfield F.C. players
Matlock Town F.C. players
Heanor Town F.C. players
Alfreton Town F.C. players
Living people
Sportspeople from Crewe
English footballers
Association football defenders
People educated at Ruskin High School, Crewe